The Assassination of Saint Peter Martyr may refer to:
The Assassination of Saint Peter Martyr (Bellini)
The Assassination of Saint Peter Martyr (Moretto)
The Assassination of Saint Peter Martyr (Palma Vecchio)